The Treaty of Fort Pitt, also known as the Treaty With the Delawares, the Delaware Treaty, or the Fourth Treaty of Pittsburgh, was signed on September 17, 1778, and was the first formal treaty between the new United States of America and any American Indians, in this case the Lenape, who were called Delaware by American settlers. Although many informal treaties were held with Native Americans during the American Revolution from 1775 to 1783, the first one that resulted in a formal document was signed at Fort Pitt, Pennsylvania, now the site of Downtown Pittsburgh. It was essentially a treaty of military alliance between the Lenape Nation and the United States.

Background
In 1778, the Continental Army started to contemplate an expedition against the British to the west of the Appalachian Mountains, in particular at Detroit. For that end the patriots had to march through the Ohio Valley where Lenape tribes resided. Continental Congress decided to negotiate a formal treaty to secure free passage. It appointed three diplomatic commissioners and appropriated $10,000 to purchase trade goods for the Lenapes.

Negotiations
The commissioners arrived to Pittsburgh in March 1778. It took time to initiate and pursue negotiations. They were conducted on the Lenape side by Koquethaqechton, known as White Eyes, Hopocan, known as Captain Pipe, and John Kill Buck (Gelelemend), and Andrew Lewis and Thomas Lewis for the fledgling United States. After the treaty was finally approved and signed, it was witnessed by Brigadier General Lachlan McIntosh, Colonel Daniel Brodhead, and Colonel William Crawford.

Treaty
The treaty gave the United States permission to travel through the Lenape territory and called Lenape to afford American troops whatever aid they might require in their war against Great Britain, including participation of Lenape warriors. The United States was planning to attack the British fort at Detroit, and Lenape assistance was essential for success.

In exchange, the United States promised "articles of clothing, utensils and implements of war" and to build a fort in Delaware country "for the better security of the old men, women and children... whilst their warriors are engaged against the common enemy." Although not part of the signed treaty, the commissioners pointed out the American alliance with France and intended that the Lenape would become active allies in the war against the British. The possibility of creation of a new Native American state was discussed.

The treaty also recognized the Lenapes as a sovereign nation, guaranteed their territorial rights, and even encouraged the other Ohio Country Indian tribes friendly to the United States to form a state headed by the Lenapes with representation in the Continental Congress. The extraordinary measure had little chance of success, and some suggest that the authors of the treaty were knowingly dishonest and deceitful. Others suggest that it was the Lenape chief White Eyes who proposed the measure in the hope that the Lenapes and other tribes might become the fourteenth state of the United States. In any case, it was never acted upon by either the United States or the Lenape Nation.

Implementation
According to Daniel K. Richter in Facing East from Indian Country, the Lenape perceived the agreement "merely as free passage" of revolutionary troops and the building of a protective fort to defend white settlers. The American leaders intended to use the fort for offensive campaigns and wrote into the treaty that the Lenape would attack their native neighbors.

Within a year, the Lenape were expressing grievances about the treaty. White Eyes, the tribe's most outspoken ally of the United States, allegedly died of smallpox. However, since he already had smallpox in the past, it was believed that he was killed by the American militiamen near Detroit (according to George Morgan). A Lenape delegation visited Philadelphia in 1779 to explain its dissatisfaction to the Continental Congress, but nothing changed, and the peaceful relations between the United States and the Lenape Nation collapsed and the tribe soon joined the British in the war against the American revolutionaries. The Gnadenhutten massacre in 1782 destroyed the remaining goodwill.

Commemoration
The 2013 Sacagawea dollar commemorates the Treaty of Fort Pitt. The coin depicts a turkey, a howling wolf, and a turtle, symbols of the Lenape. Its design was created by Susan Gamble, as part of the Artistic Infusion Program, and engraved by Phebe Hemphill.

References

Further reading
 Calloway, Colin G. The American Revolution in Indian County: Crisis and Diversity in Native Communities. Cambridge Studies in North American Indian History. New York: Cambridge University Press, 1995.
 Delay, Brian. Indian Polities, Empire, and the History of American Foreign Relations, Diplomatic History 39, no. 5 (November 2015): 927-42.
 Dowd, Gregory Evans. A Spirited Resistance: The North American Indian Struggle for Unity, 1745-1815. Baltimore: Johns Hopkins University Press, 1993.
 Grimes, Richard S. The Western Delaware Indian Nations, 1730-1795: Warriors and Diplomats. Rowman & Littlefield, 2017.
 Harjo, Suzan Shown (Ed.). Nation to Nation: Treaties Between the United States and American Indian Nations. Washington, D.C.: Smithsonian Institution, 2014.
 Jones, Dorothy V. License for Empire: Colonialism by Treaty in Early America. Chicago: University of Chicago, 1982.
 Prucha, Francis Paul. American Indian Treaties: The History of a Political Anomaly. Berkeley, CA: University of California Press, 1994.
 Schutt, Amy C. Peoples of the River Valleys: The Odyssey of the Delaware Indians. Philadelphia: University of Pennsylvania Press, 2007.

External links
 Treaty with the Delawares, Sept. 17, 1778

Pennsylvania in the American Revolution
Fort Pitt
Lenape
Diplomacy during the American Revolutionary War
1778 in the United States
History of Pittsburgh
Fort Pitt
Fort Pitt
Western theater of the American Revolutionary War